Vihiga Queens FC, is a Kenyan professional women's football club based in Mbale, Vihiga County that competes in Kenyan Women's Premier League, the top tier of Kenyan football. The club is affiliated to the Football Kenya Federation

The club has won the Premier League title on three consecutive occasions from 2017 to 2019. The team won the national league in 2019. In 2021, they were selected as the representative for Kenya at the CECAFA qualifiers which won by beating Ethiopian team CBE by 2–1 in the finals and qualified them to the inaugural 2021 CAF Women's Champions League.

Honours

Domestic 
League titles

 Kenyan Women's Premier League

 Winners (record) (3): 2017, 2018, 2019

Continental 

 CECAFA-CAF Women's Champions League Qualifiers

 Winners  (1): 2021

Managerial history 

  Alex Alumirah (2013–August 2021)
  Charles Okere (August 2021–November 2021)
 Boniface Nyamunyamu (December 2021–)

See also 

 Vihiga United

 Kenyan Women's Premier League
Enez Mango

References

External links 

 Vihiga Queens on Twitter
 Vihiga Queens on Facebook

Football clubs in Kenya
Women's football clubs in Kenya